The North Cork Junior A Hurling Championship (known for sponsorship reasons as the Hibernian Hotel Junior A Hurling Championship) is an annual hurling competition organised by the Avondhu Board of the Gaelic Athletic Association since 1925 for junior hurling teams in North Cork.

The series of games begin in May, with the championship culminating with the final in the autumn. The championship includes a group stage insuring teams will get at least 2 championship matches.

The North Cork Junior Championship is an integral part of the wider Cork Junior Hurling Championship. The winners and runners-up of the North Cork championship join their counterparts from the other seven divisions to contest the county championship.

Kilshannig are the title-holders after defeating Liscarroll Churchtown Gaels by 1-14 to 1-10 in the 2022 final.

History

Development

The Cork Junior Hurling Championship had been contested on a countywide basis since 1895, however, an increase in the number of participating clubs resulted in a restructuring of the entire championship. The North Cork Board was established in 1925 with other divisions in other parts of the county created in the years that followed. Since then the individual junior championships were organised on a divisional basis with the division winners progressing to contest the county series of games. The first North Cork Junior Championship was played in 1925.

In 2007 the championship was split in two with the top teams competing in the newly named North Cork Premier Junior Hurling Championship. Following this change the North Cork Junior A Hurling Championship was contested by the second tier teams. This system lasted until 2014 when the premier championship reverted to being called the North Cork JAHC.

Team dominance

Milford were the first team to enjoy multiple successes in the championship. They won four titles between 1925 and 1936, while also becoming the first club to retain the championship.

Near neighbours and local rivals Ballyhea and Newtownshandrum enjoyed a dominant period from 1939 until 1968. The two clubs shared 14 championship titles during this period. Castletownroche also had their greatest period during this time, winning four titles between 1954 and 1960.

Since the 1960s the championship was dominated by Kildorrery and Kilworth, who regularly won titles in each of the following decades. Kilworth claimed all of their 11 championships in a 45-year period between 1961 and 2006 to leave them in the top position on the all-time roll of honour. Their hegemony was closely challenged by Kildorrery who won eight of their nine championship titles between 1962 and 1988. At this time Fermoy emerged as a force, winning five championships between 1987 and 1999. Their county final defeat in 2000 brought the curtain down on their greatest era in the competition.

The first decade of the 21st century was dominated by Charleville. After a 15-year hiatus they claimed their fifth ever title in 2001. Four more championships followed between 2002 and 2011.

Format history

For the first seventy years the championship was played as a single elimination tournament whereby once a team lost they were eliminated from the championship. Since the late 1990s the championship has seen the introduction of a "back door" system which provides each team with a minimum of two games before exiting the championship.

Format

Group stage 
The 13 teams are divided into three groups of three and one group of four. Over the course of the group stage, each team plays once against the others in the group, resulting in each team being guaranteed at least three games. Two points are awarded for a win, one for a draw and zero for a loss. The teams are ranked in the group stage table by points gained, then scoring difference and then their head-to-head record. The top two teams in each group qualify for the knockout stage.

Knockout stage 
Quarter-finals: Four group winners play four group runners-up. Four teams qualify for the next round.

Semi-finals: The four quarter-final winners contest this round. The two winners from these games advance to the final.

Final: The two semi-final winners contest the final. The winning team are declared champions.

Promotion and relegation 
At the end of the championship, the winning team enters the Cork Junior A Hurling Championship and by winning this, they will be promoted to the Cork Premier Junior Hurling Championship for the following season. There is no relegation to the North Cork Junior B Hurling Championship.

Teams

2023 Teams

Qualification for subsequent competitions

The North Cork Championship winners and runners-up qualify for the subsequent Cork Junior Hurling Championship. Prior to 2017 only the winners were permitted to progress to the county championship.

Roll of honour

List of finals

Notes
 1932 – the first match ended in a draw.
 1963 – the first match ended in a draw: Kildorrery 4-05, Kilworth 4-05.
 1964 – the first match ended in a draw: Fermoy 7-05, Ballyhea 6-08.
 1978 – the first match ended in a draw: Castletownroche 3-12, Kildorrery 4-09.
 1984 – the first match ended in a draw: Kildorrery 0-13, Charleville 2-07.
 1985 – the first match ended in a draw: Clyda Rovers 0-11, Kilworth 2-05.
 1992 – the first match ended in a draw: Newtownshandrum 3-04, Dromina 1-10.
 2020 – the first match ended in a draw: Harbour Rovers 1-17, Kilshannig 1-17.

Records and statistics

Teams

By decade

The most successful team of each decade, judged by the number of North Cork Junior A Hurling Championship titles, is as follows:

 1930s: 3 for Milford (1933-35-36)
 1940s: 3 for Newtownshandrum (1940-44-46)
 1950s: 5 for Ballyhea (1950-53-55-58-59)
 1960s: 3 each for Kildorrery (1962-63-69) and Kilworth (1961-66-67)
 1970s: 3 for Kildorrery (1972-73-77)
 1980s: 2 each for Kilworth (1980–83), Kildorrery (1984-88) and Clyda Rovers (1985–89)
 1990s: 4 for Fermoy (1990-91-94-99)
 2000s: 4 for Charleville (2001-02-07-08)
 2010s: 2 each for Dromina (2014-17) and Harbour Rovers (2015-16)

Gaps

Top ten longest gaps between successive championship titles:

 71 years: Dromina (1927-1998)
 54 years: Shanballymore (1942-1996)
 45 years: Milford (1936-1981)
 30 years: Clyda Rovers (1989-2019)
 26 years: Castletownroche (1928-1954)
 25 years: Charleville (1945-1970)
 24 years: Newtownshandrum (1968-1992)
 24 years: Kildorrery (1988-2012)
 23 years: Fermoy (1941-1964)
 23 years: Fermoy (1964-1987)

Winners and finalists

Two teams have won the North Cork Junior A Hurling Championship and the North Cork Junior A Football Championship in a single year as part of a hurling-Gaelic football double. Fermoy became the first club to win the double when they achieved the feat in 1941. Clyda Rovers became only the second team to complete the double in 1989.

Kildorrery, Mallow, Buttevant and Doneraile also hold the distinction of being dual North Cork Championship winning teams, however, these were not achieved in a single calendar year. Combined teams Glanworth-Harbour Rovers and Ballygiblin-Mitchelstown have also won North Cork titles in both codes.

County Record

2023 Championship

Group stage
Group A

Group B

Group C

Knockout stage

See also
North Cork Junior A Football Championship

External links
 Avondhu GAA website

References

North Cork Junior A Hurling Championship